Najbolje godine is a Croatian television drama series produced by Nova TV, which aired for two seasons, from 2009 to 2011. The main directors were Mladen Dizdar, Robert Orhel, Goran Rukavina and Kristijan Milić. The series' Creative Producer was Milivoj Puhlovski. The TV series began airing on 14 September 2009 on Nova TV in Croatia. It aired on Mondays to Thursdays in the prime-time slot 8-9pm. It also aired in Bosnia and Hecegovina on "Program Plus" (shared channel by Kanal ATV and NTV HAYAT), in Slovenia on POP TV and in Serbia on TV B92.

Filming
Filming the first season began in July 2009. Due to its very high ratings, filming continued for a second season. The series had a main cast of 20 actors. The story takes place in a fictional village called Dragošje, located in the Slavonia region of Croatia. Sixty percent of filming was exterior, in Eko Selo, Žumberak, Croatia. Nova TV also constructed a village set near the town of Samobor.

Cast and characters
† indicates character dies during the series

Notes and references

External links

 
 

Croatian television soap operas
2009 Croatian television series debuts
2011 Croatian television series endings
2000s Croatian television series
2010s Croatian television series
Television shows filmed in Croatia
Television shows set in Croatia
Nova TV (Croatia) original programming
Pop (Slovenian TV channel) original programming